Snap rounding is a method of approximating line segment locations by creating a grid and placing each point in the centre of a cell (pixel) of the grid.  The method preserves certain topological properties of the arrangement of line segments.

Drawbacks include the potential interpolation of additional vertices in  line segments (lines become polylines), the arbitrary closeness of a point to a non-incident edge, and arbitrary numbers of intersections between input line-segments.   The 3 dimensional case is worse, with a polyhedral subdivision of complexity  becoming complexity O(n4).

There are more refined algorithms to cope with some of these issues, for example  iterated snap rounding guarantees a "large" separation between points and non-incident edges.

Algorithm

Properties
 Canonicity:
 Efficiency;  A number of efficient implementations exist.

Conversely there are undesirable properties:

 Non-idempotence: Repeated applications can cause arbitrary drift of points.

References

Bibliography

External links
 Efficient Snap-Rounding with Integer Arithmetic, Binay K. Bhattacharya and Jeff Sember

Algorithms